Manila Patriotic School is a Mandarin, Cantonese Chinese school located in Tomas Mapua Street, Santa Cruz, City of Manila, Philippines. It was founded in November 1912, and is recognized as one of the oldest Chinese Filipino schools City of Manila and in the Philippines. Private, non-sectarian and funded by alumni association of the school. Sisters school Baguio Patriotic Highschool.

Educational institutions established in 1912
Chinese-language schools in Manila
Education in Binondo
High schools in Manila
1912 establishments in the Philippines